A Different Shade is the debut studio album from Swedish singer Erik Segerstedt, released on February 1, 2007. It debuted at number two on the Swedish Albums Chart. The album spawned two singles, "Can't Say I'm Sorry", a number-one single, and "How Did we Change", a number-two single.

Track listing
"2 Happy 2 Soon"
"How Did We Change"
"I Can't Say I'm Sorry"
"When I Hear You Say My Name"
"Wherever You Are"
"I'm Not Alone"
"Bring My Baby Back"
"She's So"
"Freeway"
"Knockin' on Heaven's Door"
"Everything Changes"

Charts

References

2007 albums
Erik Segerstedt albums